Connecticut's 120th House of Representatives district elects one member of the Connecticut House of Representatives. It encompasses parts of Stratford and has been represented by Democrat Phil Young since 2018.

Recent elections

2020

2018

2018 special

2016

2014

2012

References

120